KBE may refer to:
 Knight Commander of the Most Excellent Order of the British Empire, post-nominal letters
 Knowledge-based engineering